George Leslie Drewry   (3 November 1894 – 2 August 1918) was an English recipient of the Victoria Cross, the highest and most prestigious award for gallantry in the face of the enemy that can be awarded to British and Commonwealth forces.

Drewry was born on 3 November 1894 to Thomas and Mary Drewry. As a 20-year-old, and a midshipman in the Royal Naval Reserve during the First World War, he was awarded the Victoria Cross for his actions on 25 April 1915 at V Beach in the Landing at Cape Helles, during the Gallipoli campaign.

He later achieved the rank of lieutenant and was killed in an accident at Scapa Flow, Orkney Islands, on 2 August 1918.

His Victoria Cross is displayed at the Imperial War Museum, London, England.

Citation

References
Monuments to Courage (David Harvey, 1999)
The Register of the Victoria Cross (This England, 1997)
Scotland's Forgotten Valour (Graham Ross, 1995)
VCs of the First World War: Gallipoli (Stephen Snelling, 1995)
VCs of the First World War: The Naval VCs (Stephen Snelling, 2002)

External links
Location of grave and VC medal (E. London)
 

1894 births
1918 deaths
Military personnel from Essex
British Gallipoli campaign recipients of the Victoria Cross
British military personnel killed in World War I
People educated at Merchant Taylors' School, Northwood
People from Forest Gate
Royal Navy officers
Royal Navy officers of World War I
Royal Navy recipients of the Victoria Cross
Accidental deaths in Scotland
British Merchant Navy personnel
Royal Naval Reserve personnel
Burials in England